The women's 100 metre freestyle event at the 2004 Olympic Games was contested at the Olympic Aquatic Centre of the Athens Olympic Sports Complex in Athens, Greece on August 18 and 19.

Australia's Jodie Henry edged out defending Olympic champion Inge de Bruijn to take the gold medal in this event, by thirty-two hundredths of a second (0.32), outside the record time of 53.84 seconds. U.S. swimmer Natalie Coughlin, who previously claimed the title in the 100 m backstroke, earned the bronze at 54.40 seconds. In the semifinals, Henry captured fourteen hundredths of a second (0.14) off her teammate Lisbeth Lenton's world record (set five months earlier in Sydney), with a time of 53.52. This was also the final appearance for de Bruijn at the Olympics, before she retired from her swimming career in 2007.

Records
Prior to this competition, the existing world and Olympic records were as follows.

The following new world and Olympic records were set during this competition.

Results

Heats

Semifinals

Semifinal 1

Semifinal 2

Final

References

External links
Official Olympic Report

W
2004 in women's swimming
Women's events at the 2004 Summer Olympics